Pic d'Artsinol (also Pic d'Arzinol) is a mountain of the Pennine Alps, located west of Evolène in the canton of Valais.

References

External links
 Pic d'Artsinol on Hikr

Mountains of the Alps
Mountains of Switzerland
Mountains of Valais
Two-thousanders of Switzerland